This article details the 2014 Durand Cup Quarter-Finals.

The group stage features 12 teams: the 9 automatic qualifiers and the 3 winners of the preliminary stage.

The teams are drawn into four groups of three, and play each once. The match days are between 29 October to 4 November.

The group winner will advance to the Semi-Finals.

Group A

Group B

Group C

Group D

References

External links 
 Official website 

Q